Eschweilera mexicana, the cajita or jicarillo, is a species of woody plant in the family Lecythidaceae. It is found only in Mexico. It is threatened by habitat loss.

References

mexicana
Flora of Mexico
Vulnerable plants
Taxonomy articles created by Polbot